Majicavo Koropa is a village in the commune of Koungou on Mayotte.

Populated places in Mayotte